Mother (stylized as [m]other) is the upcoming seventh studio album by American metalcore band Veil of Maya. The album will be released on May 12, 2023, through Sumerian Records was produced by Zach Jones.

Background and promotion
On July 24, 2019, Veil of Maya's follow-up to their 2017 album False Idol appeared to be in production with the band sharing various photos from the studio with producer Taylor Larson on their social media. On October 30, the band have returned to the studio for their new album and began initial sessions on the effort with producer Taylor Larson. According to their social media, those sessions have resumed with Larson back behind the boards.

On October 8, 2021, the group's guitarist Marc Okubo revealed that the reason for the relative delay of their new record comes from the band having decided to scrap much of what they had previously recorded for it. On April 20, 2022, Veil of Maya released the first single "Synthwave Vegan". On September 14, the band completed tracking the effort and have begun mixing the album with new material.

On February 8, 2023, Veil of Maya unveiled the second single "Godhead" and its corresponding music video. On March 8, the band published the third single "Red Fur" and an accompanying music video. At the same time, they officially announced the album itself and release date, whilst also revealing the album cover and the track list.

Track listing
Adapted from Apple Music.

Notes
 "Reconnect" is stylized as "[re]connect".

Personnel
Veil of Maya
 Lukas Magyar – vocals
 Marc Okubo – guitars, programming
 Danny Hauser – bass
 Sam Applebaum – drums

Additional personnel
 Zach Jones – production

References

2023 albums
Veil of Maya albums
Sumerian Records albums
Upcoming albums